Naticopsis is an extinct genus of small sea snails belonging to the family Neritopsidae.

Fossil records
This genus is known in the fossil record from the Permian to the Triassic periods (from about 412.3 to 242.0 million years ago). Fossils of species within this genus have been found in China, United States, Europe, Cambodia, Iran, Japan, Malaysia and Pakistan.

Species
Species within this genus include:

 †Naticopsis altonensis
 †Naticopsis apollinis
 †Naticopsis bowsheri
 †Naticopsis carleyana
 †Naticopsis carlyana
 †Naticopsis chesterensis
 †Naticopsis comperta
 †Naticopsis confusa
 †Naticopsis consobrina
 †Naticopsis convoluta
 †Naticopsis cretacea
 †Naticopsis deformis
 †Naticopsis depressa
 †Naticopsis efossa
 †Naticopsis errans
 †Naticopsis eruca
 †Naticopsis glomerosa
 †Naticopsis gracilis
 †Naticopsis hallii
 †Naticopsis inflata
 †Naticopsis inornata
 †Naticopsis insculpta
 †Naticopsis irregularis
 †Naticopsis judithae
 †Naticopsis kaibabensis
 †Naticopsis kayseri
 †Naticopsis laeta
 †Naticopsis levis
 †Naticopsis macrostoma
 †Naticopsis manitobensis
 †Naticopsis marginata
 †Naticopsis mariona
 †Naticopsis marthaae
 †Naticopsis microtricha
 †Naticopsis minuta
 †Naticopsis naticaeformis
 †Naticopsis nexicosta
 †Naticopsis oblata
 †Naticopsis opimavoluta
 †Naticopsis osbornei
 †Naticopsis ovoidea
 †Naticopsis pegmihumerosa
 †Naticopsis phillipsi
 †Naticopsis planifrons
 †Naticopsis phebeia
 †Naticopsis plena
 †Naticopsis plicatula
 †Naticopsis primigenia
 †Naticopsis protei
 †Naticopsis protogaea
 †Naticopsis purpura
 †Naticopsis remex
 †Naticopsis ruchholtzi
 †Naticopsis scintilla
 †Naticopsis semistriata
 †Naticopsis sirodoti
 †Naticopsis subovata
 †Naticopsis suturicompta
 †Naticopsis taemasensis
 †Naticopsis tortum
 †Naticopsis transversa
 †Naticopsis trevorpaticiciorum
 †Naticopsis tumescens
 †Naticopsis variata
 †Naticopsis velox
 †Naticopsis wakehami
 †Naticopsis waterlooensis
 †Naticopsis wortheni
 †Naticopsis wortheniana

References

 F. M'Coy. 1844. A synopsis of the characters of the Carboniferous limestone fossils of Ireland 1-274
 K. Bandel. 2007. Description and classification of Late Triassic Neritimorpha (Gastropoda, Mollusca) from the St Cassian Formation, Italian Alps. Bulletin of Geosciences 82(3):215-274

Neritopsidae
Prehistoric gastropod genera
Extant Permian first appearances
Triassic extinctions
Paleozoic life of Ontario
Paleozoic life of Alberta
Paleozoic life of Manitoba
Paleozoic life of the Northwest Territories
Paleozoic life of Yukon